Foot of Ten is a census-designated place in Allegheny and Juniata Townships in Blair County, Pennsylvania, United States.  It is located approximately one mile west of the small borough Duncansville on Foot of Ten Road, and about 2.5 miles (4 km) north of the even smaller borough Newry. It is often considered a region of Duncansville, despite lying outside  the borough limits. As of the 2010 census, the population was 672 residents.

The town was named Foot of Ten because of its location at the foot of the tenth inclined plane of the Allegheny Portage Railroad.

Demographics

As of 2020, 560 people live in Foot of Ten.

See also
Puzzletown, a nearby unincorporated place on Puzzletown Road.

References

Census-designated places in Blair County, Pennsylvania
Census-designated places in Pennsylvania